LBY or lby may refer to:
 LBY, the ISO 3166-1 alpha-3 code of Libya
 LBY, the station code for Lüboyuan railway station, Henan, China
 lby, the ISO 639-3 code for Lamalama language, Queensland, Australia